Gzików  is a village in the administrative district of Gmina Błaszki, within Sieradz County, Łódź Voivodeship, in central Poland.

Notable residents
Jan Mączyński (c. 1520–c. 1587), humanist and lexicographer

References

Villages in Sieradz County